Valashed (also Romanized as Valāshīd and Velāshīd; also known as Velesht) is a village in Miandorud-e Kuchak Rural District, in the Central District of Sari County, Mazandaran Province, Iran. At the 2006 census, its population was 240, in 66 families.

References 

Populated places in Sari County